The Baptist Times is a website owned by the Baptist Union of Great Britain reporting on the Baptist Church in Britain. 

It has been in production (originally as a newspaper) since 1885 and today has an estimated readership of 24,000.

It has won the Churches Media Council's Andrew Cross Award for the best regional paper, for its production of a daily paper for the Baptist World Congress in 2005.

Due to falling circulation and difficulties of selling advertising space, the paper ceased print publication in November 2011, with plans for a retrospective to be published in January 2012. The website launched in 2012.

Fake news controversy 
In November 2019, an EU Watchdog uncovered evidence The Baptist Times was among 265 media outlets which had been used by an India-based influence network to spread disinformation about Pakistan.

References

External links 
 

Baptist newspapers
Publications established in 1885
Publications disestablished in 2011
Newspapers published in Oxfordshire
1885 establishments in England
2011 disestablishments in England
Baptist Christianity in the United Kingdom
Weekly newspapers published in the United Kingdom
Defunct weekly newspapers